The 1924–25 season was the club's 5th official football season and their 22nd year in existence. They qualified for the playoffs, but lost to Galatasaray in the semi finals 1-6.

İstanbul Football League
Beşiktaş finished in the top 4, qualifying for the playoffs, along with Galatasaray, Vefa S.K. and Anadolu Üsküdar 1908.

Semi finals

External links
http://www.angelfire.com/nj/sivritepe/5758/artlIST.html

Beşiktaş J.K. seasons
Besiktas